Cihanbeyli is a town and district of Konya Province in the Central Anatolia region of Turkey. According to 2000 census, population of the district is 75,871 of which 18,306 live in the town of Cihanbeyli.

Cihanbeyli district, has a significant Kurdish population from various tribes.

History 
Cihanbeyli was part of Pitassa in antiquity.

Composition

Notable people 
 Eyüp Can (boxer) (1964*), Boxer
 Leyla Güven (1964*), Kurdish Politician

Notes

References

External links
 District governor's official website 
 District municipality's official website 

Populated places in Konya Province
Districts of Konya Province
Kurdish settlements in Turkey
Lycaonia